Tan Sri Dato’ Seri Haji Idris bin Jusoh (Jawi: إدريس بن جوسوه; born 15 November 1955) is a Malaysian politician who has served as Chairman of the Federal Land Development Authority (FELDA) since May 2020. He served as the Minister of Higher Education and Minister of Education II in the Barisan Nasional (BN) administration under former Prime Minister Najib Razak from May 2013 to the collapse of the BN administration in May 2018. He also served as the 12th Menteri Besar of Terengganu from March 2004 to March 2008, Member of Parliament (MP) for Besut from May 2013 to November 2022, Member of the Terengganu State Legislative Assembly (MLA) for Jertih from March 2004 to May 2013 and Chairman of the Majlis Amanah Rakyat (MARA) from July 2008 to March 2013. He is a member of the United Malays National Organisation (UMNO), a component party of the ruling BN coalition.

Early life 
Idris Jusoh or popularly known as "Yeh" (Yeh is just a shortform for Idris, most Kelantanese call people with the name Idris as Yeh and Jertih, at least according to some folklores, used to belong to Kelantan) attended elite school (STAR) from 1968 to 1973.

Yeh was in Green House. He was a school prefect too. He was one of the best students in STAR during his time. Those days, best students were sent to Australia for matriculation even before the MCE(SPM) results were known. And he was one of them.

He came back to Malaysia before completing his studies in Australia because his father died. Later on he attended USM and was at one time USM's "overall best student".

Yeh became famous when he won Terengganu for Barisan Nasional from PAS in 2004 and he became the state MB. PAS, the incumbent party, won only 4 seats while Idris-led BN conquered 28.

He was MARA chairman until his recent appointment as Minister of Education II. Yeh is married to a Kelantanese lady whom he met in USM.

Education background
Primary: SK Seberang Jerteh, Terengganu (1962-1968)
Secondary: Sekolah Tuanku Abdul Rahman (STAR) Ipoh (1968-1973)
Blackburn High School, Victoria, Australia (1974)
Bachelor in Social Sciences (Economics), Universiti Sains Malaysia (1980)
Entrepreneurship Course, University of Aston, England (1984)
Masters in Business Administration (MBA) (Finance), University of New Haven, USA (1988)
Arabic language studies, University of Jordan (1994)
Advanced Management Programme, INSEAD, France (2008)
"Leaders In Developing Countries" Programme - Harvard Kennedy School of Executive Education, Massachusetts, USA (2009)

Political career

Position Held

Government/Private
Minister of Higher Education  (July 2015 – 2018) 
Minister of Education II (May 2013 – July 2015)
Chairman of MARA (August 2008 – April 2013)
Chief Minister of Terengganu (2004 – 2008)
Terengganu State Assemblyman (Constituency of Jerteh) (2004-2013)
Chairman, Board of Directors Ketengah (2000-2008)
Deputy Minister, Ministry of Entrepreneurial Development (1995 -1999)
Besut Member of Parliament (1995 – 1999) (2013 –present) 
MARA council member (1991 – 1993)
Managing Director, Jusoh Enterprise (1988 – 1995)
Managing Director, Jusoh Sawmill (1980–1986)

Politics
 UMNO Supreme Council Member (2000–2018)
 Chairman of Coordination Council, UMNO Negeri Terengganu (2004- 2008)
 Chairman of Barisan Nasional Terengganu Committee (2004- 2008)
 Division Chief, UMNO Besut (2000 – 2013)
 Division Youth Chief, UMNO Terengganu (1992-1993)
 Division Youth Chief, UMNO Besut (1985-1995)

Terengganu
Following the 2008 Malaysian general election, Barisan Nasional managed to win a majority in the Terengganu state election, garnering 24 out of 32 state seats on offer, with PAS winning the remaining 8 seats.

In the formation of the new Terengganu state government, the federal government under the then Prime Minister Abdullah Ahmad Badawi recommended Idris Jusoh as Menteri Besar, who received full support of twenty-three of the 24 Barisan Nasional state assemblymen elected.

A crisis soon ensued after the Sultan of Terengganu, Mizan Zainal Abidin, who is also the Yang di-Pertuan Agong (Supreme Ruler) of Malaysia, refused to re-appoint and swear in Idris as Menteri Besar. On 22 March 2008, the office of the Sultan of Terengganu announced the appointment of Kijal assemblyman Ahmad Said instead of Idris Jusoh.

The Prime Minister responded by saying that the appointment of Ahmad Said was unconstitutional as it went against the wishes of the assemblymen and the Prime Minister's office who have supported Idris Jusoh candidacy for Menteri Besar. The 22 other BN assemblymen had also pledged their support toward the appointment of Idris Jusoh according to Deputy Prime Minister Najib Tun Razak. Ahmad Said was given warning that he would be stripped of his UMNO membership "for disobeying the party's leadership". However he was not stripped of his UMNO membership

On 26 March 2008, Prime Minister Abdullah Ahmad Badawi and Sultan Mizan Zainal Abidin met at Istana Negara to resolve the impasse. The Prime Minister accepted the King's appointment of Ahmad Said as Menteri Besar of Terengganu. He also apologised to the King for the public spat over the appointment of the mentri besar, explaining that there was no intention to disparage or humiliate the royal household. This apparent backdown was due to threat that the royal household would be prepared to dissolve the state assembly if there had been a motion of no-confidence against Ahmad Said by the 22 Umno state assemblymen.

The crisis was one of the only royal interventions in Malaysia in recent times.

On 10 September 2013, referring to the National Education Blueprint, he made a highlight in the news by saying this in a forum in Sabah, "If some people feel the system is not good and want to send their children overseas to study, the government cannot stop them. But the Ministry will work towards improving the country’s education system,"

On 21 February 2015, he declared that Malaysia's higher education is now on par with those of developed nations including the United Kingdom, Germany and Australia, said Second Education Minister Datuk Seri Idris Jusoh. He said this was proven by the fact that 135,000 foreign students made up 10% of students at national higher educational institutions in the country. This statement was largely criticized due to its over optimism. On 24 February 2015, Idris released an article entitled "What it Means to be World Class" to explain the statement as we as other education matters.

Social contributions
 Global Sciences and Innovation Advisory Council(GSIAC) member (2013 – present)
 Member, Bumiputera Agenda Action Council (MTAB) -(Februari 2011– present)
 Member, Pahang State Economic Advisory Council (2012– present)
 Deputy Chairman, UMNO Malaysia Economic Bureau (2008–present)
 Member, Yayasan IQRA Board of Trustees (2011 – present)
 Chairman, 4th Bumiputera Economic Congress (1999)
 Chairman, Tunku Abdul Rahman Foundation (2012-sekarang)
 Founder, MIND Centre (Mindset), Besut  (2008)
 Founder, IMTIAZ schools & Board of Trustees (1999)
 Founder, Pintar Quran Board of Directors (1994)
 Founder, Ulul Albab Programme (2006)
 Founder, Fulbright Scholars English Teaching Assistants Programme (2006)

Awards 
President of the USM Students Council (1978-1979)
Gold Medal Award Recipient for being Best Student in USM (1980)
President of the International Student Association in University New Haven, USA (1987)
Best Club Award, Youth Entrepreneurship Clubs (1994)
Special Appreciation Award : Individual Malaysian Franchise Award (2000/2001)

Election results

Honours
 :
  Commander of the Order of Loyalty to the Crown of Malaysia (PSM) – Tan Sri (2022)
  :
 Meritorious Service Medal (PJK) (1994)
  Knight Commander of the Order of the Crown of Terengganu (DPMT) – Dato' (1998)
  Knight Grand Companion of the Order of Sultan Mizan Zainal Abidin of Terengganu (SSMZ) – Dato' Seri (2004)

See also
 Besut (federal constituency)

References

Chief Ministers of Terengganu
Malaysian people of Malay descent
Malaysian Muslims
United Malays National Organisation politicians
Living people
1955 births
People from Terengganu
Alumni of Aston University
University of New Haven alumni
University of Jordan alumni
Harvard Kennedy School alumni
Members of the Dewan Rakyat
Members of the Terengganu State Legislative Assembly
Government ministers of Malaysia
Terengganu state executive councillors
Education ministers of Malaysia
21st-century Malaysian politicians

Knights Commander of the Order of the Crown of Terengganu
Universiti Sains Malaysia alumni
Commanders of the Order of Loyalty to the Crown of Malaysia